The Nurses is a serialized primetime medical drama that was broadcast in the United States on CBS from September 27, 1962, to May 11, 1965. For the third and final season, the title was expanded to The Doctors and the Nurses and it ran until 1965, when it was transformed into a half-hour daytime soap opera. The soap opera, also called The Nurses, ran on ABC from 1965 to 1967.

Synopsis
The series is set in Alden General Hospital (patterned after Roosevelt Hospital) in New York, and the primetime program starred Zina Bethune as Gail Lucas, the young nurse, and Shirl Conway as Liz Thorpe, her older nurse mentor.

Unlike most television dramas of the era, save for ABC's police drama Naked City (1958–1963) and the sitcom The Patty Duke Show (1963–1966), the series was filmed in New York and not Hollywood. The show was mainly filmed at the Filmways and Pathe Studios in Manhattan.

The program was nominated for five Primetime Emmy Awards.

Cast
 Zina Bethune as Gail Lucas
 Shirl Conway as Liz Thorpe
 Michael Tolan as Dr. Alex Tazinski (1964–1965)
 Joseph Campanella as Dr. Ted Steffen (1964–1965)

Other performers who appeared in episodes were Billie Allen, Margaret Barker, John Beal, Lane Bradbury, Michael Conrad, Ruby Dee, Ivan Dixon, Dana Elcar, Elizabeth Frazier, Robert Gerringer, Arlene Golonka American actress, George Grizzard, Vincent Guardino, Larry Haines, Barbara Harris, Joey Heatherton, William Hickey, Dustin Hoffman, Ellen Holly, Bernard Hughes, Kim Hunter, Diana Hyland, Albert Grant, Lee Grant, 
Judson Laire, John Lasell, Linda Lavin, Joeseph Leon, Vivica Lindfors, Clifton James, Lincoln Kilpatrick, Jan Miner, Kermit Murdock, Peg Murray, Susan Oliver, Estelle Parsons,Jane Rose, Polly Rowles, Diana Sands, Zackary Scott, Fran Sharon, William Shatner, Martin Sheen, Joe Silver, Hilda Simms, Paul Stevens, Inger Stevens, Elaine Stritch, Florence Stanley, Michael Strong, and Dolph Sweet.

Episodes

Season 1 (1962–63)

Season 2 (1963–64)

Season 3: The Doctors and the Nurses (1964–65)

ABC TV series

The Nurses is an American daytime soap opera that aired on ABC from September 27, 1965 to March 31, 1967. The show was a continuation of the CBS primetime drama.

The setting was Alden General Hospital and the main characters included Mary Fickett as Liz Thorpe, R. N, and Melinda Cordell as the younger and less experienced Gail Lucas, R. N., along with Arthur Franz as Hugh McCloud, Valerie French as Helen Cox, Judson Laire as Jamie McCloud, Lee Patterson as Brad Kirnan, Nicholas Pryor as Ken Alexander, Polly Rowles as Miss Grassberg, Paul Stevens as Dr. Paul Fuller, and Lesley Woods as Vivian Gentry.

Production
Richard Holland and Gordon Russell were the head writers. The executive producer was Doris Quinlan, who later produced One Life to Live, All My Children and The Doctors. Several of the performers on this show were later on One Life to Live and All My Children''.  The music for the series was composed by Frank Lewin.

References

External links

1962 American television series debuts
1965 American television series endings
1965 American television series debuts
1967 American television series endings
American Broadcasting Company original programming
1960s American medical television series
American television soap operas
CBS original programming
Black-and-white American television shows
English-language television shows
Serial drama television series
Television series by CBS Studios
Television shows set in New York City
Works about nursing
Works set in hospitals